Mileševo (Hungarian: Kutaspuszta and Drea) is a village in Serbia. It is situated in the Bečej municipality, South Bačka District, Vojvodina province. The village has a Hungarian ethnic majority and its population numbering 1,118 people (2002 census).

Ethnic groups (2002 census)

Population of the village include:
 571 (51.07%) Hungarians
 485 (43.38%) Serbs
 19 (1.70%) Croats
 others.

Historical population

1961: 1,908
1971: 1,468
1981: 1,301
1991: 1,218

See also
List of places in Serbia
List of cities, towns and villages in Vojvodina

References
Slobodan Ćurčić, Broj stanovnika Vojvodine, Novi Sad, 1996.

External links
History of Drea
History of Kutaspuszta

Places in Bačka
South Bačka District
Bečej
Hungarian communities in Serbia